Mohammed Ali Tayea (1945-2000) was one of the political leaders in Egypt during the Sadat and Mubarak era. He died on 1 May 2000.

Introduction
Mohammed Tayea was born on 20 July 1945 in Alexandria at his mother's residence. He lived in Sohag at Girga city during his childhood. He gained a bachelor's degree in civil engineering at Assiut University in 1971.

After graduating, he worked at the Red Sea construction company until 1974 on the board of directors in Suez alongside his work as an engineering contractor.

In 1977 he married Ms. Fawzia Abo Zeid AbduLatif after graduating with a degree in philosophy at Ain Shams University.

They had 3 children (Shehab, Shady and Shahinaz). Shehab graduated in naval engineering at the Arab Academy for Science and Technology, Shady in commerce at the Modern Academy and Shahinaz with honours in engineering at the Modern Academy.

Family
He hails from an Upper Egyptian family through his father (Ali Mohammed Tayea) Sohag who raised his Mohammed Tayea with traditional values.

Mohammed Tayea has 2 brothers and 3 sisters (Hassan Ali Tayea, an engineer at Girga City Council in Sohag; Gamal Abdel Nasser Ali Tayea, a businessman in England since 1985 and owner of an  import-export company).

First one has 3 sons : Sara, Ali and Mostafa .

Involvement in projects
 Suez Hospital
 Minia Hospital
 Ismailia University Hospital
 Medical Center in Bor Tawfik
 Badr Mosque in Suez
 Fayed Mosque in Ismailia
 Fertilizer factory in Suez and Talkha
 Some projects with the Nasr Petroleum Company
 Suez company for petrol processing.
 Educational buildings for the authorities
 Low-cost, mid-range and luxury housing

Major projects include:
 Giant power and water stations in South Sinai and East Kantara
 Automatic mill in Ismailia
 Sand brick factory in Quesna

Conference participation
 Management of Major Projects Conference (Cairo, 1980)
 International Housing Conference (Sarajevo, Yugoslavia, 1986)
 The Development of Construction Equipment Conference (London, England, 1987)
 Management of Companies Conference (Alexandria, 1991)

Appointments
 Member of Wafd Party in Suez
 Member of the Egyptian Parliament for the Suez area - New Wafd party 1984
 Member of the Housing Commission in Parliament
 Member of Engineers Union
 Member of Human Rights Watch and Amnesty International
 Member of Contractors Federation and Commission on Classification
 Member of Egyptian Civil Engineers Society
 Member of Egyptian Business Administration Society
 Member of Collaborative Society Education in Schools

He also was involved in many charities such as the Qurran Charity in Suez which he headed.

1945 births
2000 deaths
20th-century Egyptian engineers
Assiut University alumni
Ain Shams University alumni
Muslim reformers
Wafd Party politicians
New Wafd Party politicians
Members of the House of Representatives (Egypt)